The Eerste Divisie 2009–10 was the 54th season of the Eerste Divisie since its establishment in 1956.
The previous year's winners were VVV-Venlo; they, with runner-up RKC Waalwijk, after a promotion/relegation playoff win over De Graafschap, were promoted to the Eredivisie. Twenty teams took part: eighteen from the 2008–2009 season and relegated teams FC Volendam and De Graafschap.  The season's champion was promoted to the Eredivisie, while eight other teams, the second- through fifth-place finishers and period winners, faced the Eredivisie's sixteenth- and seventeenth-place finishers in promotion/relegation playoffs.  For the first time since 1971, Eerste Divisie clubs also faced relegation; the last- and second-to-last-place teams were relegated to the new Topklasse, in which the best teams from Dutch amateur football play. The 2009–10 Eerste Divisie was sponsored by the Belgian beer brand Jupiler and so the official name of the league was Jupiler League.

The league started with twenty teams, but was reduced to nineteen in January 2010 following the disbandment of debt-ridden HFC Haarlem. All league games involving HFC Haarlem were cancelled and the number of teams that was relegated was consequently reduced to one.

Teams overview

Venues

Coaches and budget

Standings and results

Standings

Results table

Standings 1st Period

Standings 2nd Period

Standings 3rd Period

Standings 4th Period

Playoffs

Please note that the following teams: Sparta Rotterdam & Willem II joined the Eerste Divisie-teams for the playoffs, after finishing 16th and 17th in the Eredivisie.

Round 1

Round 2

Round 3

Willem II and Excelsior will play in Eredivisie 2010–11.

Statistics
Last updated: 9 April 2010; Source: Eerste divisie (official site)

Top scorers

Other scorers

10 goals

 Jeremy Bokila (AGOVV)
 Paco van Moorsel (Den Bosch)
 Género Zeefuik (Dordrecht)
 Patrick N'Koyi (Eindhoven)
 Kermit Erasmus (Excelsior)
 Guyon Fernandez (Excelsior)
 Luis Pedro (Excelsior)
 Halil Çolak (Go Ahead Eagles)
 Eldridge Rojer (Zwolle)

9 goals

 Jeffrey de Visscher (Cambuur)
 Dembe Traore (Fortuna Sittard)
 Steve De Ridder (Graafschap)
 Marc Höcher (Helmond Sport)
 Mark Veldmate (Helmond Sport)

8 goals

 Reza Ghoochannejhad (Cambuur)
 Ibad Muhamadu (Dordrecht)
 Roy Stroeve (Emmen)
 Jordy Buijs (De Graafschap)

7 goals

 Jeffrey Vlug (Eindhoven)
 Michal Janota (Excelsior)
 Koen van der Biezen (Go Ahead Eagles)
 Robbie Haemhouts (Omniworld)
 Tim Peters (Oss)
 Marnix Kolder (Veendam)
 Paul de Lange (Volendam)
 Rowin van Zaanen (Volendam)
 Erik Bakker (Zwolle)
 Danny Schreurs (Zwolle)
 Arne Slot (Zwolle)

6 goals

 Milos Malenovic (Emmen)
 Ryan Koolwijk (Excelsior)
 Roel de Graaff (Haarlem)
 Jules Reimerink (Go Ahead Eagles)
 Malcolm Esajas (MVV)
 Brian Linssen (MVV)
 Michiel Hemmen (Veendam)
 Cecilio Lopes (Zwolle)

5 goals

 Danny Guijt (Cambuur)
 Oguzhan Türk (Cambuur)
 Paul Jans (Den Bosch)
 Niels Vorthoren (Den Bosch)
 John Verhoek (Dordrecht)
 Oussama Assaidi (De Graafschap)
 Bruno Andrade (Helmond Sport)
 Charles Kazlauskas (Helmond Sport)
 Gideon Boateng (MVV)
 Sander Duits (Omniworld)
 Johan Plat (Oss)
 Joel Tshibamba (Oss)
 Gregory Nelson (RBC)
 Sjaak Polak (RBC)
 Tjeerd Korf (Veendam)
 Michiel Kramer (Volendam)
 Albert van der Haar (Zwolle)

4 goals

 Paul Mulders (AGOVV)
 Kévin Diaz (Cambuur)
 Wilmer Kousemaker (Den Bosch)
 Johan Versluis (Dordrecht)
 Adnan Alisic (Excelsior)
 Norichio Nieveld (Excelsior)
 Mitchell Schet (Excelsior)
 Žarko Grabovac (Fortuna Sittard)
 Marcus Rychlik (Fortuna Sittard)
 Sander Post (Go Ahead Eagles)
 Joey Suk (Go Ahead Eagles)
 Soufian El Hassnaoui (De Graafschap)
 Laurens ten Heuvel (Haarlem)
 Jeffrey Altheer (Helmond Sport)
 Christian Brüls (MVV)
 Reginald Faria (Omniworld)
 Emrullah Güvenç (Oss)
 Jordan Remacle (RBC)
 Erwin Koen (Telstar)
 Frank Korpershoek (Telstar)
 Anco Jansen (Veendam)
 René Wessels (Veendam)

3 goals

 Jaimé Bruinier (AGOVV)
 Hans van de Haar (AGOVV)
 Julius Wille (AGOVV) 
 Léon Hese (Cambuur)
 Adnan Barakat (Den Bosch)
 Samuel Scheimann (Den Bosch)
 Sven Delanoy (Dordrecht)
 Juanito Sequeira (Dordrecht)
 Rob van Boekel (Eindhoven)
 Ruud van der Rijt (Eindhoven)
 Xander Houtkoop (Emmen)
 Kevin Wattamaleo (Excelsior)
 Rick Geenen (Fortuna Sittard)
 Harrie Gommans (Fortuna Sittard)
 Anthony Di Lallo (Fortuna Sittard)
 Ramon Voorn (Fortuna Sittard)
 Patrick Gerritsen (Go Ahead Eagles)
 Marco Parnela (Go Ahead Eagles)
 Erwin Buurmeijer (Emmen)
 Guus Joppen (Helmond Sport)
 Serdar Öztürk (Omniworld)
 Genaro Snijders (Omniworld)
 Renee Troost (Omniworld)
 Davy Zafarin (Oss)
 Umut Gündoğan (RBC)
 Melvin de Leeuw (RBC)
 Cees Toet (RBC)
 Raymond Fafiani (Telstar)
 Furdjel Narsingh (Telstar)
 Benito Olenski (Telstar)
 Bernard Hofstede (Volendam)
 Thijs Sluijter (Volendam)
 Ruud Kras (Zwolle)
 Etiënne Reijnen (Zwolle)
 Niek Vossebelt (Zwolle)

2 goals

 Jop van der Linden (AGOVV)
 Chiró N'Toko (AGOVV)
 Rachid Ofrany (AGOVV) 
 Hesdey Suart (AGOVV)
 Guy Ramos (Dordrecht)
 Rochdi Achenteh (Eindhoven)
 Remy Amieux (Eindhoven)
 Mark Bloemendaal (Eindhoven)
 Bart Van Den Eede (Eindhoven)
 Sjors Paridaans (Emmen)
 Angelo Zimmerman (Emmen)
 Roland Bergkamp (Excelsior)
 Ard Van Peppen (Excelsior)
 Leen van Steensel (Excelsior)
 Tim Vincken (Excelsior)
 Kari Arkivuo (Go Ahead Eagles)
 Donny de Groot (Go Ahead Eagles)
 Nigel Hasselbaink (Go Ahead Eagles)
 Maikel Kieftenbeld (Go Ahead Eagles)
 Jhon van Beukering (De Graafschap)
 Peter Jungschläger (De Graafschap)
 Joep van den Ouweland (De Graafschap)
 Vito Wormgoor (De Graafschap)
 Youssef Chida (Helmond Sport)
 Daniel Guijo-Velasco (Helmond Sport)
 Alexandre Bryssinck (MVV)
 Ebrima Ebou Sillah (MVV)
 Philipp Haastrup (MVV)
 Tom Van Hyfte (MVV)
 Faty Papy (MVV)
 David Depetris (Omniworld)
 Jerge Hoefdraad (Omniworld)
 Mitchell Kappenberg (Omniworld)
 Marien Willemsen (Omniworld)
 Bart van Hintum (Oss)
 Patrick Lip (Oss)
 Nicky Hayen (RBC)
 John Schot (RBC)
 Ralf Seuntjes (RBC)
 Koen Brands (Telstar)
 Nicandro Breeveld (Telstar)
 Martijn van der Laan (Veendam)
 Aaron Meijers (Volendam)
 Yannick de Wit (Volendam)
 Gergő Beliczky (Zwolle)

1 goal

 Ramon Leeuwin (AGOVV)
 Olaf Lindenbergh (AGOVV)
 Nick Mulder (AGOVV)
 Stanley Tailor (AGOVV)
 Nyron Wau (AGOVV)
 Paul Beekmans (Cambuur)
 Robert van Boxel (Cambuur)
 Dave Huymans (Cambuur)
 Rudy Jansen (Cambuur)
 Dennis van der Ree (Cambuur)
 Steef Nieuwendaal (Den Bosch)
 Jordens Peters (Den Bosch)
 Danny Verbeek (Den Bosch)
 Stef Wijlaars (Den Bosch)
 Nick Coster (Dordrecht)
 Brian Pinas (Dordrecht)
 Prince Asubonteng (Eindhoven)
 Jean Black (Eindhoven)
 Bart van Brakel (Eindhoven)
 Robin Faber (Eindhoven)
 Selmo Kurbegovic (Eindhoven)
 Pedro Beda (Emmen)
 Steven de Blok (Emmen)
 Tim Siekman (Emmen)
 Erik van der Ven (Emmen)
 Guus de Vries (Emmen)
 Wesley Wakker (Emmen)
 Sigourney Bandjar (Excelsior)
 Kamohelo Mokotjo (Excelsior)
 Samir El Moussaoui (Excelsior)
 Jerson Anes Ribeiro (Excelsior)
 Marc Mboua (Fortuna Sittard)
 Pieter Nys (Fortuna Sittard)
 Sven Verdonck (Fortuna Sittard)
 Ramon Voorn (Fortuna Sittard)
 Paul Voss (Fortuna Sittard)
 Dennis Hollart (Go Ahead Eagles)
 Purrel Fränkel (De Graafschap)
 Martijn Meerdink (De Graafschap)
 Rogier Meijer (De Graafschap)
 Muslu Nalbantoglu (De Graafschap)
 Niek Sebens (De Graafschap)
 Irfan Bachdim (Haarlem)
 Jeffrey van den Berg (Haarlem)
 Benjamin van den Broek (Haarlem)
 Calvin MacIntosch (Haarlem)
 John Nieuwenburg (Haarlem)
 Jasmin Ramic (Haarlem)
 Marvin Wijks (Haarlem)
 Joost Habraken (Helmond Sport)
 Sjaak Lettinga (Helmond Sport)
 Ilja van Leerdam (Helmond Sport)
 Vincent Weijl (Helmond Sport)
 Gerard Aafjes (MVV)
 Omer Kulga (MVV)
 Jonas Olsen (MVV)
 Emra Tahirović (MVV)
 Richard van Heulen (Omniworld)
 Wilco Krimp (Omniworld)
 Mikhail Rosheuvel (Omniworld)
 Chakib Tayeb (Omniworld)
 Melvin Kolf (Oss)
 Mike van der Kooy (Oss)
 Aziz Moutawakil (Oss)
 Dirk Schoofs (Oss)
 Mike Thijssen (Oss)
 Chris de Wagt (Oss)
 Rence van der Wal (Oss)
 Tjaronn Chery (RBC)
 Cuco Martina (RBC)
 Jerold Promes (Telstar)
 Gregory Schaken (Telstar)
 Jeroen Tesselaar (Telstar)
 Gersom Klok (Veendam)
 Ewald Koster (Veendam)
 Lars Lambooij (Veendam)
 Niek Loohuis (Veendam)
 Sander Rozema (Veendam)
 Alair Cruz Vicente (Veendam)
 Gerard Wiekens (Veendam)
 Mohammed Ajnane (Volendam)
 Tim Bakens (Volendam)
 Gerson Sheotahul (Volendam)
 Maikel van der Werff (Volendam)
 Eric Fernando Botteghin (Zwolle)

Own goals

 Mark de Vries (Cambuur, against Excelsior)
 Robert van Boxel (Cambuur, against MVV)
 Angelo Martha (Den Bosch, against Veendam)
 Johan Versluis (Dordrecht, against MVV)
 Arjen Bergsma (Emmen, against Dordrecht)
 Sjors Paridaans (Emmen, against Telstar)
 Michel Poldervaart (Emmen, against Cambuur)
 Jelle De Bock (Eindhoven, against Telstar)
 Ivo Rossen (Eindhoven, against Fortuna Sittard)
 Norichio Nieveld (Excelsior, against Volendam)
 Nico Vanek (Fortuna Sittard, against Haarlem)
 Joey Suk (Go Ahead Eagles, against Fortuna Sittard)
 Rogier Meijer (De Graafschap, against AGOVV)
 Frank Karreman (Haarlem, against Den Bosch)
 Robert van Westerop (Helmond Sport, against De Graafschap)
 Philipp Haastrup (MVV, against AGOVV)
 Maarten Boddaert (RBC, against Zwolle)
 Glynor Plet (Telstar, against MVV)
 Mitch Apau (Veendam, against MVV)
 Alair Cruz Vicente (Veendam, against AGOVV)
 Henny Schilder (Volendam, against MVV)
 Maikel van der Werff (Volendam, against RBC)
 Eric Fernando Botteghin (Zwolle, against Oss)

See also
 2009–10 Eredivisie
 2009–10 KNVB Cup

External links
JupilerLeague.nl – Official website Eerste Divisie 
KNVB.nl – Official website KNVB 

Eerste Divisie seasons
2009–10 in Dutch football
Neth